Velké Opatovice is a town in Blansko District in the South Moravian Region of the Czech Republic. It has about 3,600 inhabitants.

Administrative parts
Villages of Bezďečí, Brťov, Korbelova Lhota, Svárov and Velká Roudka are administrative parts of Velké Opatovice.

Geography
It lies on the border between the Boskovice Furrow and Podorlická Uplands. The town is situated on the Jevíčka stream. The municipality of Malá Roudka forms an enclave in the municipal territory of Velké Opatovice.

History
The first written mention of Opatovice is from 1308. There were two fortresses owned by different lords. It was originally two separate villages called Horní ("Upper") Opatovice and Dolní ("Lower") Opatovice. In 1848 they were merged and name Opatovice. The "Velké" adjective (meaning "great") was added in 1888. It 1969, the municipality became a town.

Demographics

Economy
Velké Opatovice is home to one of the largest employers in the region, P-D Refractories CZ company, which is a manufacturer and distributor of refractory products and raw materials. The predecessor of the company, which mined claystone in the area, was founded in 1892. From 1950, the company was known as Moravské šamotové a lupkové závody (i.e. "Moravian grog and fire clay plants"). In 2000, it was acquired by the international Preiss-Daimler Group and renamed.

Transport
Velké Opatovice is located on the Velké Opatovice – Skalice nad Svitavou railway of local importance.

Sights

The Velké Opatovice Castle is the main monument. The Baroque castle was built on the site of a Gothic fortress in 1757. The Art Nouveau modifications were made in 1913. Since 1924, it is a property of the town. After a fire in 1973, it was partially repaired in the late Baroque style. Today the castle complex houses the town hall, a cinema, and two museums.

The Moravian Cartographic Centre is focused on historical development of cartography, especially in the Czech Republic and on geodetic and cartographic instruments and aids.

The Museum and Monument of Velké Opatovice presents historic and ethnographic collections, local industry, and works of local artists. It also includes the memorial hall of the sculptor Karel Otáhal, who lived here for 29 years. Otáhal is also the creator of a lifesize statue of Bedřich Smetana located in the castle grounds.

The Church of Saint George was built in 1790–1791 and replaced an old Gothic church from the late 14th century. Its main attraction is the altar sculpture from 1951 by Karel Otáhal, depicting St. George fighting with the dragon.

Notable people
Karel Otáhal (1901–1972), sculptor; lived and died here

Twin towns – sister cities

Velké Opatovice is twinned with:
 Elbingerode, Germany
 Stari Grad, Croatia

References

External links

Cities and towns in the Czech Republic
Populated places in Blansko District